Ikpoba Okha is a Local Government Area of Edo State, Nigeria. Its headquarters are in the town of Idogbo, along Benin/Abraka Road. The LGA is made up of several towns and villages such as Evbuomodu, Uwusan, Obazagbon, Agedo, Evbumufi, Etiosa, Obadoloviyeyi, Obenevbugo, Obe, Oghoghobi, Okha, Obanyantor, Ekae, Utezi, Uhie, Ogheghe, Obagie Obaretin and so on. The estimated population of Ikpoba Okha is 301,447 inhabitants with the majority of the area’s dwellers being members of the Bini ethnic division.

Ikpoba Okha LGA covers a total area of 862 square kilometres and has an average temperature of 28 °C. The average humidity level of the area is put at 69 percent while the average wind speed in the LGA is 11 km/h. Farming is a prominent feature of the economic life of Ikpoba Okha with crops such as yam, plantain, banana, and vegetables grown in the area. Trade also flourishes in Ikpoba Okha LGA with the area hosting several markets such as the Oka and the Oregbeni markets which provide platforms for the exchange of a variety of goods and services for the area’s inhabitants. Other important economic activities in Ikpoba Okha include hunting, lumbering, and blacksmithing.

The postal code of the area is 300.

References

Local Government Areas in Edo State